Clarks Creek is a  long 2nd order tributary to the Ararat River in Patrick County, Virginia.

Course
Clarks Creek rises on the Fall Creek divide at Carters Mill in Patrick County, Virginia.  Clarks Creek then flows southwest to join the Ararat River about 1.5 miles southwest of The Hollow, Virginia.

Watershed
Clarks Creek drains  of area, receives about 50.0 in/year of precipitation, has a wetness index of 324.21, and is about 62% forested.

See also
List of rivers of Virginia

References

Rivers of Virginia
Rivers of Patrick County, Virginia